Stonehouse is a community in the Canadian province of Nova Scotia, located in  Cumberland County. It was probably named for Stonehouse, Plymouth in Devon, England.

References

External links
Stonehouse on Destination Nova Scotia

Communities in Cumberland County, Nova Scotia
General Service Areas in Nova Scotia